Bhadrakali Lake is a lake in Warangal, Telangana built by Ganapati of Kakatiya dynasty. The lake is situated near the famous Bhadrakali Temple.

History 
It was built by Ganapati Deva of Kakatiya dynasty.

Tourism
The lake is being developed into the largest Geo-Biodiversity Cultural Park – with promenades, historic caves, suspension bridges, natural trails, nesting ground and ecological reserves. Funds have also been sanctioned for strengthening the lake bund, under the HRIDAY scheme.

References

Reservoirs in Telangana
Artificial lakes of India